Mustard Seed International (MSI) is an interdenominational, Christian organization that empowers the next generation and establishes thriving communities through a holistic model of transformative Christian Education. It was established in Formosa (now Taiwan) by Lillian Dickson following World War II. After the war, Dickson and her husband returned to Formosa to further establish their ministry. Subsequently, Lillian took a more active role in the ministry work that would one day be known as "The Mustard Seed" and later Mustard Seed International. In the 60s, the organization supported clinics worldwide and assisted in establishing public health interventions. MSI has been relevant to tens of thousands of people in over sixty years. Initially, the organization includes partnerships and initiatives in India, Africa, and Eastern Europe, now it focuses the programs only in Indonesia.

References 

International Christian organizations
Educational charities